The Mercedes Benz M186 Engine was a 3.0–litre single overhead camshaft inline-6 developed in the early 1950s to power the company's new flagship 300 "Adenauer" (W186) four-door saloon. It made its debut at the Frankfurt Motor Show in April 1951.

Designed to give reliable service under prolonged hard use, the iron block/aluminum head engine featured deep water jackets, an innovative diagonal head-to-block joint that allowed for oversized intake and exhaust valves, reverse-flow cylinder head, thermostatically controlled oil cooling, copper-lead bearings, and a hardened crankshaft.

Variants of the M186 went on to be used in the exclusive 300 S/300 Sc gran tourer, W194 300SL racer, iconic gullwing 300SL sports car, and Mercedes top-end 300-series sedans and limousines, and coupes of the early to mid-1960s.  Production ended in 1967, four years after the introduction of the 600 Grosser Mercedes and the  M100 V-8.

While sharing many design features with Mercedes'  M180 engine introduced at the same show (such as staggered valve arrangement and rockers running off a single overhead camshaft driven by a duplex cam-chain), the two were of completely different design with little or no inter-changeability of parts.

The term "big six" is sometimes used to distinguish the large block 3.0 L M186 from the small block M180 and its derivatives.

M186 Variants

M186
The 3.0–litre M186 was introduced in 1951 for use in the company's flagship 300 "Adenauer" (W186) four-door saloon. Designed to give reliable service under prolonged hard use, the engine featured deep water jackets, thermostatically controlled oil cooling, copper-lead bearings, and a hardened crankshaft. 
Fitted with twin downdraft Solex carburettors it produced  at a 6.4:1 compression ratio.

M188
The W188 300 S coupé/cabriolet was released in 1952 with the M188 variant, being fed by triple downdraft Solex carburettors and producing  at 5000 rpm and 7.8:1 compression ratio.

M189
The first M189 appeared in the 300d pillarless limousine of 1957, three years after the M198. The engine then appeared in 1961 in the Mercedes-Benz W112 300SE and its long wheelbase derivative (also called 300SE; the SEL nomenclature would first be used on the subsequent W109 LWB sedans) two years later. The final incarnation of the M189 was in the W108 300SEb and W109 300SEL of 1965–1967, producing .

M194

The M194 engine was developed in 1952 for the W194 300SL racer.

Like the W188 used in the ultra-exclusive 300 S coupé/cabriolet, the M194 was outfitted  with three two-barrel Solex carburetors. Similar to the M198 used in the production 300SL, the engine is titled 50 degrees to the left in order to reduce the height of the hood, and uses a dry sump lubrication system instead of an oil pan and reservoir. It is also mounted behind the front axle for better weight distribution.

M198

The high-performance, fuel-injected M198 was created in 1954 for the first generation of the 300SL, known colloquially as the "Gullwing".  To fit under its low profile hood the engine was tilted 50-degrees to the left.  The result for the car was aerodynamic efficiency, and an enormous sand-cast aluminum intake manifold that stretched across the engine's entire breadth. In order to deliver track-ready performance, race-derived features were built in, including a dry sump lubrication system and Bosch mechanical direct fuel-injection, one of the first production cars with fuel injection. This engine produced  DIN net at 5,800 rpm and  DIN net of torque at 4,600 rpm and  net (brake hp) at 6,100 RPM and  net torque at 4,800 RPM.  An optional high-performance "Sport" camshaft was also available.  This was the only available configuration for the Roadster version of the 300 SL when it made its debut in 1957.  Production ended in 1964.

M199
A significantly detuned direct-injection,  dry sump oil system engine was used in the late W188 300 Sc of 1955 to 1958 producing  at 5400 rpm and 8.55:1 compression ratio

See also
 Mercedes-Benz M180 engine
 List of Mercedes-Benz engines

References 

M186
Straight-six engines
Gasoline engines by model
Slant engines